Events in the year 1946 in Portugal.

Incumbents
President: Óscar Carmona 
Prime Minister: António de Oliveira Salazar

Arts and entertainment

Films
Camões

Sport
In association football, for the first-tier league seasons, see 1945–46 Primeira Divisão and 1946–47 Primeira Divisão; for the Taça de Portugal season, see 1945–46 Taça de Portugal. 
 30 June - 1946 Taça de Portugal Final
 Establishment of Clube Oriental de Lisboa
 Establishment of G.C. Alcobaça
 Establishment of SC Mêda
Establishment of the Portuguese Volleyball Championship.

Births
 13 February - Artur Jorge, football manager, former footballer
 24 May - Jesualdo Ferreira, football manager

References

 
Years of the 20th century in Portugal